Fewell-Reynolds House is a historic home located near Madison, Rockingham County, North Carolina. It was built about 1820, and is a two-story, six bay, central hall plan, Federal style frame dwelling with a one-story wing.  It sits on a stone and brick foundation and has a steeply pitched gable roof.  The front facade features a four bay shed roofed porch.

It was listed on the National Register of Historic Places in 1979.

References

Houses on the National Register of Historic Places in North Carolina
Federal architecture in North Carolina
Houses completed in 1820
Houses in Rockingham County, North Carolina
National Register of Historic Places in Rockingham County, North Carolina